Ángel Dennis Diaz (born 13 June 1977) is a Cuban-born Italian volleyball player.

Biography
He played for IVECO Palermo from 1998 to 2000. With Cuba national team, he won a World League in 1998 and an America's Cup in 2001, before abandoning his country to move to establish himself in Italy in the latter year.

After a period of inactivity, he returned to play in 2003-2004 for Latina Volley, before moving to Lube Banca Marche Macerata the following year, after a short stint in Qatar. With Lube he won a top national division and an Italian Supercup in 2006, and two CEV Cups (2005–2006). In 2006 he married Italian volleyball player Simona Rinieri, by which he got Italian nationality.

In 2017, he signed a contract with Sporting CP.

External links
Page at Italy's Volleyball League website 

1977 births
Living people
Cuban emigrants to Italy
Sportspeople from Havana
Sporting CP volleyball players
Cuban men's volleyball players
Italian men's volleyball players
Volleyball players at the 2000 Summer Olympics
Olympic volleyball players of Cuba
Pan American Games medalists in volleyball
Pan American Games gold medalists for Cuba
Medalists at the 1999 Pan American Games